DDB Worldwide Communications Group LLC, known internationally as DDB, is a worldwide marketing communications network. It is owned by Omnicom Group, one of the world's largest advertising holding companies.  The international advertising networks Doyle Dane Bernbach and Needham Harper merged their worldwide agency operations to become DDB Needham in 1986. At that same time the owners of Doyle Dane Bernbach, Needham Harper and BBDO merged their shareholdings to form the US listed holding company Omnicom. In 1996, DDB Needham became known as DDB Worldwide.

History

Doyle Dane Bernbach 
Bill Bernbach and Ned Doyle worked together at Grey Advertising in New York, where Bernbach was Creative Director. In 1949, they teamed up with Mac Dane, who was running a tiny agency. Together they started Doyle Dane Bernbach in Manhattan. Dane ran the administrative and promotional aspects of the business; Doyle had a client focus and Bernbach played an integral role in the writing of advertising, leading the creative output of the agency.

The agency's first ads were for Ohrbach's department store exemplifying a new "soft-sell" approach to advertising - with catchy slogans and witty humour contrasting the repetitive and hard-sell style in vogue until then. The new agency was initially successful in winning business for clients with small budgets.  Their campaigns for Volkswagen throughout the 1950s and 1960s were said to have revolutionized advertising. Notable campaigns included the 1959 Think Small series of Volkswagen advertisements, which was voted the No. 1 campaign of all time in Advertising Age's 1999 The Century of Advertising. In 1959, the firm created the character Juan Valdez for the National Federation of Coffee Growers of Colombia. In 1960, the agency won the account of Avis, then the number-two auto rental company. The tongue-in-cheek approach, "We Try Harder Because We're Number 2," was a major success (and remains part of the company's slogan today: "We Try Harder"). The DDB "Daisy" campaign is considered to have been a significant factor in Lyndon B. Johnson's defeat of Barry Goldwater in the 1964 United States presidential election and landed Mac Dane on the infamous Nixon's Enemies List. 1972's Little Mikey commercial for Quaker Oats ran continuously in the United States for twelve years.

A branch office was opened in Los Angeles in 1954. In 1961, DDB opened its first international office in West Germany to service Volkswagen. Significant growth came in the mid-1960s after the firm signed Mobil and the available budgets grew materially. Offices in London and other European locations were opened. Bernbach was appointed Chairman and Chief Executive Officer in 1968 when the agency was publicly listed; he became Chairman of the Executive Committee in 1976.

The impact of Doyle Dane Bernbach's creativity on advertising around the world, and the history of management crises that led to merger in 1986, are detailed in the book Nobody's Perfect: Bill Bernbach and the Golden Age of Advertising. Written by journalist Doris Willens, who was DDB's Director of Public Relations for 18 years, the book is based on oral histories and interviews with the three founders, the line of the agency's presidents, and key creative and account people. By 1986, four years after Bernbach's death, the agency group had worldwide billings of USD $1.67B, 54 offices in 19 countries, and 3,400 employees, but showed profits declining 30% on the prior year.

Needham Harper & Steers 
Needham Harper Worldwide started in Chicago in 1925 as Maurice H. Needham Co. with two clients and billings totalling $270,000. By 1934, it was named Needham, Louis and Brorby, Inc., with billings of US$1 million, had signed the Kraft Foods account and had opened a Hollywood office to service its clients' network radio program production needs.

In 1951, the agency opened a New York office to concentrate on the rapidly expanding television industry. That office merged with Doherty, Clifford, Steers and Shenfield in 1965 and changed its name to Needham, Harper & Steers. The Chicago office grew with accounts such as the Morton Company, Household Finance Corporation, General Mills and Frigidaire. The firm won the Oklahoma gasoline account (later Esso, then ExxonMobil) after research indicated that American drivers wanted both power and play, and copywriter Sandy Sulcer, working with psychologist Ernest Dichter, chose the tiger to symbolize that desire, which led to the campaign Put a Tiger in Your Tank. In 1966, the agency opened a Los Angeles office to handle the Continental Airlines business. An office was opened in Washington D.C. in 1971 initially to service some local McDonald's business. Soon, this agency was winning government and media business and an "Issues and Images" division was opened to service corporate public relations. This business would eventually become Biederman & Company. The agency worked on public service campaigns called Buckle Up for Safety as well as a traffic safety campaign entitled Watch Out For The Other Guy for the Advertising Council.

Keith L. Reinhard came from Chicago to head the worldwide firm in 1982 and, by 1986, there were thirty two offices outside the US; American offices in New York, Chicago, Los Angeles, Washington, Boston, Phoenix, Sacramento, San Diego, Baltimore and Dayton; and diversification  in  Porter Novelli, Biederman & Company and the international direct-response agency DR Group, Inc.

DDB Needham merger and the formation of Omnicom 
Concerned by the swathe of hostile public company takeovers in the US the 1980s Reinhard started discussions with BBDO president Allen Rosenshine about a merger and included the then fragile Doyle Dane Bernbach business in the discussions. In 1986, the three networks agreed to merge into the Omnicom Group which would act as a holding company, becoming at that time the world's largest global advertising agency group. BBDO remained separate and retained its network. Needham Harper had a good presence in the Midwestern United States and was complemented by Doyle Dane Bernbach's strength in New York and Europe. Reinhard became Chairman and CEO of the merged DDB Needham Worldwide.  The merged group suffered some initial account losses due to conflicts (DDB's Volkswagen was retained and Needham's Honda account lost while DDB's RJR Nabisco was lost in favour of Needham's General Mills) and some senior staff losses as Reinhard set about combining the two disparate cultures, but, by 1988, the firm was having success in winning significant new business and has continued to grow since then.

In 1998 (having by then dropped the Needham from its name), DDB Worldwide was named Advertising Age's first-ever "Global Network of the Year". In 2003, it earned that same accolade from both Advertising Age and Adweek. Under the leadership of Ken Kaess, Bob Scarpelli, and Lee Garfinkel, it won the honor again from Adweek in 2004. Subsequently, its operating unit Tribal DDB became the first digital agency to be named Global Network of the Year by Advertising Age. In 2011 DDB Worldwide had more than 200 offices in 95 countries.

Long standing client relationships 
Since Doyle Dane Bernbach commenced a US relationship with Volkswagen in 1959, it's been a consistent and significant client in various parts of the world. Needham Harper started working with McDonald's in the 1960s and that client has worked with DDB in several countries unceasingly since then. A global relationship with ExxonMobil has been consistent since the 1960s. As of 2020, longstanding broad worldwide relationships continue to be held with Unilever and Johnson & Johnson.

Leadership since 1986 
Presidents or Global CEOs since the formation of DDB Needham in 1986:
 Keith L. Reinhard 1986–1999 (then Chairman 1999–2018; Chairman Emeritus since 2018)
 Ken Kaess 1999–2006 (President 1999-2001; Global CEO 2001-2006)
 Chuck Brymer 2006–2018 (then Chairman since 2018)
 Wendy Clark 2018–2020
 Martin O'Halloran since 2020

Local office histories

London 
At Omnicom's 1986 foundation, the merging Needham and Doyle Dane Bernbach operation each had London offices with the latter having been established in 1963. Reinhard made six trips to London, fired most of the Needham managers, and put DDB managers in charge. By 1989, the operation was struggling and Omnicom acquired Boase Massimi Pollitt to consume the DDB operation and renamed it as BMP DDB. It operated under that name until January 2004 when it was changed to DDB London, in line with the network's decision to rebrand all agencies it had acquired. The agency struggled during 2006 with management problems and a string of account defections. Stability was restored in 2007, the agency seemed unable to restore its lost billings. It continued to tumble down the UK agency rankings, ending up outside the Top 20 for 2010. In 2012, Adam & Eve DDB was created from the merger of DDB London with the fast-expanding independent Adam & Eve. By 2016 Adam & Eve DDB was one of the network's best performing offices worldwide.

Australia 
In Australia in 2020, DDB operates from Sydney and Melbourne. Both offices trace their history to the post-war foundation of United Services Publicity in Melbourne in 1945 by ex-servicemen rebuilding their careers. Founder John F. Barnes and other staff had worked antebellum at Samson Clark Price-Berry which closed down during WWII. United Services Publicity grew and in 1961 established international links when the British SH Benson group bought 25%. It was renamed USP Benson and opened in Sydney. Needham, Harper & Steers bought into USP Benson in 1967 and by 1971 had effected a name change to USP Needham. The 1986 creation of the Omnicom holding company saw the Australian merger of the Needham and Doyle Dane Bernbach operations and becoming known as DDB Needham in 1986, DDB Worldwide from 1998 then in 2019 back to Doyle Dane Bernbach. In 2021 DDB Australia celebrated a continuous 50 year client relationship with McDonald's Australia.

Australian agencies acquired at some point by USP Needham or DDB and which trace a lineage to DDB Australia today include the Sydney agencies SPASM; Bartlett, Murphy and McKenzie; Harriman and Hill; Beeby Advertising; Magnus, Nankervis & Curl; and the Melbourne agencies Berry Currie; Hyde Everett Fuller Kutt; Leonardi & Curtis; Walker Herbert & Associates; Nowland, Robinson & Perret; Kuczynski & Zeigler; Whybin Dery Barnes.

Stockholm 
DDB Stockholm is one of the largest agencies in Sweden with clients as Swedish Armed Forces, McDonald's, Telia, Volkswagen and Vattenfall. It is also one of the most acclaimed agencies within DDB Worldwide in recent years, earning accolades like "World's best interactive agency" in Cannes 2010 and Cannes Lions Titanium in 2011.

Canada 
DDB Canada opened in Vancouver in 1998 where Frank Palmer became its CEO after merging his own company Palmer Jarvis into DDB Worldwide. He left the company in 2019.

Rafting Incident, 1987 

DDB executives were among the fatalities in a whitewater rafting accident on 1 August 1987. A group of 12, including 11 top-level executives from major firms, were rafting along the Chilko River in British Columbia, Canada, in a stretch of water known as the "Whitewater Mile." The raft struck a large rock and pitched 11 of the occupants into the rapids. Five people were killed. Among the dead:

 Richard T. O'Reilly - Director of Media/Advertising for Partnership for a Drug-Free America and an integral part of US President Ronald Reagan's 1980 presidential campaign advertising strategy.
 Robert V. Goldstein - Vice President for Advertising, Procter & Gamble
 James Fasules - Former Senior Vice President, DDB Needham
 Stuart Sharpe - Senior Vice President, DDB Needham
 Gene Yovetich - Senior Vice President, DDB Needham

The family of Robert Goldstein filed a lawsuit against DDB afterwards. DDB’s US President Al Wolfe had planned the whitewater rafting excursion. At issue in the lawsuit was the lack of specificity in the trip waiver as to assumed risks in whitewater rafting. The waiver presented to the participants of the trip did not specify that whitewater rafting would be involved.

The HBO movie White Mile (1994) was based on the rafting accident and portrays not only a similar trip and accident but subsequent litigation with a nearly identical award outcome. The film stars Alan Alda, Peter Gallagher, and Robert Loggia.

Reputation 
DDB has been cited as one of the leading creative agencies in the world by the Gunn Report (Nov 2007, 2008, 2009, 2010), the International Advertising Festival (June 2008, 2009, 2010 and 2011), Campaign (Nov 2007, Nov 2010), Spikes Asia (September 2010), Campaign Asia Pacific (December 2010), Businessweek (Feb 2008), and Global Effies/WARC (June 2011) as well as the European AME awards (2011).

References

External links 
 Official site of DDB
 Site of Tribal DDB, an interactive agency of DDB Worldwide
 Official site of the U.S. DDB Offices
 Latest news, account wins/losses and creative at Adbrands profile
 DDB's creative work and company info
 DDB Needham company history

1925 establishments in Illinois
American companies established in 1925
Advertising agencies of the United States
Marketing companies established in 1925
Companies based in New York City
Companies based in Chicago
Companies based in San Francisco
Companies based in Vancouver
Advertising agencies of Canada